Rakhwale is a 1994 Indian Hindi-language action film directed by Sudharshan Lal, starring Dharmendra, Mithun Chakraborty, Govinda and Raj Babbar in special appearances.

Plot

Cast

Dharmendra Special Appearance
Mithun Chakraborty Special Appearance
Govinda (actor) Special Appearance
Raj Babbar Special Appearance
Kader Khan as Laat Saab
Alok Nath as Satyanarayan
Dara Singh as Shamsher Singh, CBI Officer
Mukesh Khanna as CBI Officer associate of Shamsher Singh
Raza Murad as Big Boss
Sudhir Pandey as Deen Dayal
Goga Kapoor as Prosecutor
Dev Kumar
Rajesh Puri as Police Constable Satya 
Rakesh Bedi as Police Constable Ahimsa 
Firoz Irani
Harsha
Yogeeta Singh
Aatish Devgan

Songs
Music by Sonik Omi and lyrics written by Kulwant Jani. 
"Aise Mausam Me Deewani" - Alka Yagnik
"Hum Bete Hindustan Ke" - Mohammed Aziz
"I Love You I Love You" - Mohammed Aziz
"Idhar Shikhari Udhar Shikari" - Kavita Krishnamurthy
"Shahidho Ki Chithao Par" - Mohammed Aziz
"Sohni Dekhi Sassi Dekhi" - Asha Bhosle, Udit Narayan
"Wo Din Na Rahe To" - Asha Bhosle

External links

References

1994 films
Films scored by Sonik-Omi
1990s Hindi-language films
Indian action films